Flower with No Color is the collaborative album by artists Yoshimi P-We (best known for as the drummer of Boredoms) and Yuka Honda (best known as half of Cibo Matto) as Yoshimi and Yuka.  Flower with No Color was released in 2003 (see 2003 in music) on Ipecac Recordings, and contains 7 songs.

Track listing
"UMEgination" – 4:29
"Ha Wa ii Na" – 3:14
"KoRoKoKoRo'N Insects" – 1:41
"SPY said ONE" – 9:31
"La Donna Ni Demo Des Kinna" – 7:27
"Mow Deck In Eye" – 27:12
"elegant bird" – 2:13

Personnel
 Yoshimi P-We - Percussions & Drums, Grang Tang, Guitar, Piano, Trumpet, Keyboard Synthesizer, Bamboo Flute, Whistle
 Yuka Honda - Piano, Chorus & Vocal, Bass Guitar, Keyboard Synthesizer, Electric Piano

External links
Flower with No Color page on Ipecac Recordings website

Ipecac Recordings albums
2003 albums
Yoshimi and Yuka albums